Razdolnoye is a rural locality (a selo) in Malinovsky Selsoviet of Shimanovsky District, Amur Oblast, Russia. The population was 43 as of 2018. There is 1 street.

Geography 
Razdolnoye is located 17 km northeast of Shimanovsk (the district's administrative centre) by road. Bazisnoye is the nearest rural locality.

References 

Rural localities in Shimanovsky District